Paaluonys (formerly Daukšiškė) is a village in Kėdainiai district municipality, in Kaunas County, in central Lithuania. According to the 2011 census, the village had a population of 169 people. There is a library and a gristmill.

History
Till the beginning of the 20th century the village was known as Daukšiškė. During the Soviet era Paaluonys was the "Bright Road" kolkhoz center.

Demography

Images

References

Villages in Kaunas County
Kėdainiai District Municipality